Stanislav Shumovsky was a Soviet former Red Army Soldier, aviator and covert intelligence agent. Codenamed Agent Blériot, Shumovsky operated in the United States where he along with others leaked aeronautical secrets back to his home country.

Biography 

Stanislav went to the United States officially as an exchange student, and worked at M.I.T. where he had graduated, specializing in aeronautics.  His brief was to transfer cutting edge aeronautical technology to the Soviet Union and to recruit American students as spies.

Embedded into the United States as part of a 65 strong cohort of Soviet students who had come to America to attend prestigious universities, Stanislav arrived in  New York in September 1931.  His intelligence was used by the Soviet Union both during the Second World War and the Cold War.  It is very possible that his intelligence was used to create the Tu-4, a Soviet clone of the B-29 Superfortress.

He reached such high esteem in the USA that he was invited to parties attended by Shirley Temple, and to the White House to meet then President Franklin D Roosevelt.

He evaded detection his entire life and returned to the Soviet Union in the late 1940s.

Discovery 

Archives By-Fellow Svetlana Lokhova at Churchill College, Cambridge discovered the Shumovsky's real activity after reading documents and papers from the Mitrokhin Archive.  In 2018 she published a book on Stanislav called 'The Spy Who Changed History'.  He is believed to be a member of a wider Soviet programme aimed at technology transfer from the USA.

Legacy 

During the early Cold War, once either superpower could produce atom bombs, delivery of such bomb was of crucial importance. Since rocketry was still in its infancy and ICBMs had yet to be developed, long range bombers were the sole method of delivery. Shumovsky's espionage was an important part of providing a Soviet nuclear deterrent.

References

Sources 

 
 
 

Soviet spies against the United States
Soviet people of Polish descent
Massachusetts Institute of Technology alumni